White Sugar is the debut album of British Blues Artist Joanne Shaw Taylor. It was released in 2009 on Ruf Records.

Track listing
All songs by Joanne Shaw Taylor, except "Bones" by Jon Amor, Hugh Coltman, Jesse Davey, Robin Davey

"Going Home" – 4:50
"Just Another Word" – 4:07
"Bones" – 5:22 (The Hoax cover)
"Who Do You Want Me to Be?" – 3:35
"Time Has Come" – 5:51
"White Sugar" – 4:27
"Kiss the Ground Goodbye" – 4:40
"Heavy Heart" – 5:21
"Watch 'em Burn" – 5:08
"Blackest Day" – 8:17

Personnel
Joanne Shaw Taylor – guitars and vocals
David Smith – bass guitar
Steve Potts – drums

References

2009 debut albums
Joanne Shaw Taylor albums